Al Naba'ah is an area of the emirate of Sharjah in the United Arab Emirates.

Populated places in the Emirate of Sharjah